Angelo Erba (22 April 1889 – 19 April 1967) was an Italian racing cyclist. He rode in the 1921 Tour de France.

References

External links
 

1889 births
1967 deaths
Italian male cyclists
Place of birth missing